The name Makonde art refers to East African sculptures or, less frequently, to modern paintings created by craftspeople or artists belonging to the Makonde people of northern Mozambique and southern Tanzania, separated by the Ruvuma river. Art historians, dealers and collectors have created this genre of African art, that can be subdivided into African traditional artifacts or modern artistic works. This genre can be traced back to the 1930s, when the first documented exhibition of Makonde art was held at the Centro Cultural dos Novos in Mozambique.

Traditional and contemporary styles 
Makonde art can be subdivided into different styles. Traditionally, the Makonde have carved secular household objects, ritual figures and masks. After the 1930s, Portuguese colonizers and other missionaries arrived at the Mueda plateau in Northern Mozambique. They showed great interest and fascination for the Makonde wood carvings and began to order different pieces, from religious to political “eminences.” The Makonde sculptors, after noticing such interest, decided to carve the new pieces, using pau-preto (ebony wood, Diospyros ebenum) and pau-rosa (Swartzia spp.) instead of the soft and not long-lasting wood they had used before. This first contact with the Western culture can be considered to be the first introduction of the classical European style into the traditional Makonde style.

Since the 1930s, the so-called Modern Makonde Art has been developed in Tanzania. An essential step away from the traditional sculptures was the creation of abstract figures, representing mostly evil spirits, called Shetani in Swahili language, that play a special role in Swahili popular beliefs. This shetani style was created in the early 1950s by master carver Samaki Likankoa, whose patron Mohamed Peera, an art curator in Tanzania played an instrumental and decisive role in influencing the modern Makonde art movement. Some Makonde sculptors, of whom the best known is George Lugwani, have embraced a fully abstract style of carving without discernible figures. Since the 1970s, Modern Makonde Art has become part of the internationally recognized contemporary art of Africa. The most acknowledged such artist was George Lilanga, who started with carvings and became famous as a modern painter.

A special genre of traditional ritual Makonde art are the characteristic Mapiko masks (singular: Lipiko), which have been used in tribal dances accompanying coming-of-age rituals, since before contact was made with missionaries in the 19th century. These masks were painstakingly carved from a single block of light wood (usually 'sumaumeira brava') and may represent shetani spirits, ancestors, or living characters (real or idealized). The dancers wore them so that they could see through the mask's mouth or alternatively, fixed the mask on their heads, with the mask facing straight towards the audience, when they bent forward.

Changes in the 20th century 
Makonde art is an integration of dated practices of woodwork met with a demand of woodcarving of the modernized world. After the introduction of road systems in the plateaus between Tanzania and Mozambique by Portuguese troops during World War I, the traditional sense of the practice began to shift to meet new social and economical demands. Once a signifier of ritualistic expression made solely by men, and kept hidden from women, Western influences on Makonde art changed who created the art and for what reasons. Portuguese forced labor and taxes encouraged many Makonde people to expand the practices of traditional woodcarving. One way of this evolution was expressed through these figures. Traditionally, practical things like tools and ritualistic helmet masks were the center of creation. However, after the insertion of road systems, Europeans and missionaries began to commission Makonde people to create religious symbolic sculptures. This contributed to the distinction of Ujamaa, Shetani and Binadamu styles of Makonde art.

Types of Makonde art

Ujamaa or Tree of life 
Roberto Yakobo Sangwani left his home Mozambique and headed for Tanzania in the latter years of the 1950s. With him he brought a style of Makonde art formally known as Dimoongo, meaning ‘power of strength’ or ‘tree of life’. Traditionally these sculptures portrayed clusters of connected wrestlers holding up a winning victor. Gradually, the main figure shifted to represent tribal heads or other people in unity with community members or family. Regardless, of who the central figure of a sculpture is, the organization of this style represents one central figure, surrounded by and supported by other figures. These figures exemplify ujamaa (family ties) or relationships in a community and bring forth the underlying reverence the Makonde have for their ancestors or society.

Shetani 
Shetani style woodcarvings (“devil” in Swahili) are expressions of Makonde mythology and spirits. This style uses the appearance of otherworldly physical traits, like large, distorted facial or body features, and sometimes of animals to signify the spiritual realm. The essence of Shetani is thought to take five forms: human, mammal, fish, bird, and reptile. In some sculptures, there are also culturally significant symbols, like a mother's breasts or calabashes, used to carry water.

Binadamu 

Binadamu, a naturalistic type, captures the essence of Makonde social roles. Most common are depictions of men smoking and women fulfilling household chores. Once the Portuguese made contact, the market for Makonde woodcarvings flourished abroad. Many locals began to prioritize the craft and create figures embodying the daily lives of Makonde men and women to appeal to westerner taste.

Rites of passage 

Long before Makonde woodcarvings became of commercial interest, the purpose of this artform was in its characterization of evil spirits during rites of passage ceremonies. Most notable are male initiations into adulthood which is marked by circumcision. At the beginning of this rite, a ritualist dance, the Mapiko, is performed. Throughout this dance there are three active parts: A masked dancer representing a dead man who has come to haunt the village, the Mashapilo or an evil spirit seeking to spread malice and disrupt health and lastly the young man undergoing this transition into manhood who is to conquer these entities. Both of the masked dancers are symbolic expressions of the evil that must be faced and defeated by the boy, soon to be man. After this dance, a boy will receive his operation from the Mkukomela, or the “Hammerer", who conducts the entirety of the ritual. Once a boy is circumcised, he will spend days away from the general population with other men and boys in a shelter called a Likumbi. In conjunction with their healing, boys are taught their manly roles in society. There is a physical shift that includes learning to hunt and tend the land. There is also a social shift in which men are taught how to rejoin their community as men. Men are taught quality virtues and morals, how to regard elders and the appropriate manner for sexual relations. Once boys are healed, the Likumbi is destroyed with fire and they inherit new names. Woodcarvings are present during female initiation as well but at a different stage than that of males. A girl is too made women by ritualist dance and isolation however, woodcarvings are only present once a woman is married. Once a Makonde woman marries, she will carry around a wood craved doll to promote fertility.

Gallery of modern Makonde carvings

See also
Makonde chess set
Contemporary African art
Culture of Tanzania

Literature
Kingdon, Zachary. 2002. A Host of Devils: The History and Context of the Making of Makonde Spirit Sculpture. London: Routledge. 
Korn, Jorn, Jesper Kirknaes.1974. Modern Makonde Art. London, New York, Sydney: The Hamlyn Publishing Group Limited. 
Mohl, Max: Masterpieces of the Makonde. 1990–97. Ebony Sculptures from East Africa, a comprehensive photo-documentation. Vol. 1-3. Heidelberg, Germany. 
Stout, J.A.: Modern Makonde Sculpture. 1966. Kibo Art Gallery Publications, Nairobi, Kenya.

References

External links
 

 African Carvings and Sculptures at Google Arts & Culture
 A basic reading list on Makonde sculpture by Smithsonian Libraries
For more information about Makonde Art see:
Hamburg Mawingu Collection
Read about contemporary Makonde artists on AFRUM
Collection S. Hansen and other European Collections
PhD thesis concerning Makonde carvers in Mozambique:
"Carving a Life: The Political Economy of Woodcarver Livelihoods in Cabo Delgado, Northern Mozambique"

African art
Tanzanian culture
Mozambican culture
African contemporary art